The Singapore Olympic Foundation – Peter Lim Charity Cup, also known as the  Peter Lim Charity Cup in short, was an exhibition fundraising match between the Singapore Selection and 2013 Copa del Rey winners, Atlético Madrid.

The match was held at the Jalan Besar Stadium on 22 May 2013 and Atlético Madrid prevailed with a 2-0 scoreline with goals coming from Raúl García and Diego Costa.

All ticket proceeds from the match went towards the Singapore Olympic Foundation, whose aim is to help promising young athletes from humble backgrounds realise their dreams of achieving sporting excellence.

A curtain raiser was also played prior to the match, with ex-Singapore internationals taking on a team of local celebrities.

Singapore Selection

The Singapore Selection was named on 10 May 2013 and it was announced that current Singapore interim coach V Sundramoorthy would be taking charge of the team.

Apart from players from the LionsXII forming the bulk of the team, a total of 12 players from the S.League were also named, including former Singapore internationals Ahmad Latiff Khamaruddin, Indra Sahdan and Rosman Sulaiman. Foreign players Jozef Kapláň, Monsef Zerka and Sirina Camara were also selected for the game.

Squad

Pre-match

Ticketing
Tickets for the Charity Cup were made available sale from 15 April 2013 through Ticketbooth with prices ranging between $15 and $50.

Match

Details

References

2013 in Singaporean football
Atlético Madrid matches